Joseph van den Leene (12 August 165416 February 1742), lord of Lodinsart, Castillon, and Huyseghem, was the First King of Arms of the Spanish Netherlands, and the Duchy of Burgundy, this office was called Toison d'Or. On 13 June 1678, he was admitted to the House of Serhuyghs of the Seven Noble Houses of Brussels.

Notes and references

External links 

 Print of the coat of arms of Joseph van den Leene in the collection of the British Museum

Officers of arms